The Most Reverend John Brett O.P. (?–22 June 1756) was an Irish Roman Catholic clergyman who served as the Bishop of Killala from 1743 to 1748 and as Bishop of Elphin from 1748 to 1756.

References

1756 deaths
Roman Catholic bishops of Elphin
Roman Catholic bishops of Killala
Year of birth unknown
Irish Dominicans